No. 84 Group RAF was a group of the Royal Air Force Second Tactical Air Force which was operational during the Second World War

It was formed at Cowley Barracks, Oxford on 15 July 1943. By 24 July 1944 a Rear Headquarters had been formed at Cowley.

On 5 June 1944 it consisted of:
 Hawker Typhoon fighter-bombers
 No. 123 Wing RAF at RAF Thorney Island
 No. 136 Wing RAF at RAF Thorney Island
 No. 146 Wing RAF at RAF Needs Oar Point
 North American Mustangs
 No. 133 (Polish) Wing RAF at RAF Coolham
 Supermarine Spitfire fighters
 No. 131 Wing RAF at RAF Chailey
 No. 132 Wing RAF at RAF Bognor
 No. 134 Wing RAF at RAF Appledram
 No. 135 Wing RAF at RAF Selsey
 No. 145 Wing RAF at RAF Merston

Its last Air Officer Commanding was Air Vice Marshal Percy Maitland. By January 1948 Maitland was taking over command of No. 22 Group RAF.

References

Citations

Bibliography

084
084
Military units and formations established in 1943
Military units and formations disestablished in 1947